Alocasia scalprum, the Samar lance, is a species of flowering plant in the family Araceae, native to Samar island, the Philippines. Well known from cultivation as a houseplant in the Philippines, and introduced to aroid enthusiasts as Alocasia cv. Samar Lance in 1984, it was not formally described as a species until 1999. Its glossy, lance-shaped leaves with embossed veins take on a blue sheen when mature. It is similar in appearance to Alocasia heterophylla.

References

scalprum
House plants
Endemic flora of the Philippines
Flora of the Visayas
Plants described in 1999